Masset Water Aerodrome  is located adjacent to Masset, British Columbia, Canada.

Airlines and destinations

See also
Masset Airport

References

Seaplane bases in British Columbia
Airports in Haida Gwaii
North Coast Regional District
Registered aerodromes in British Columbia